Tigny-Noyelle is a commune in the Pas-de-Calais department in the Hauts-de-France region of France.

Geography
Tigny-Noyelle is located 8 miles (11 km) south of Montreuil-sur-Mer on the D143 road and very near the A16 autoroute, in the valley of the Authie. The village has an arboretum, the Arboretum de Tigny-Noyelle, which includes all species of the region. The village is the hometown of an international festival of classical music Musica Nigella that takes place every year between May and June.

Population

Places of interest
 The church of Notre-Dame, dating from the fifteenth century

See also
Communes of the Pas-de-Calais department

References

External links

 Official website of Festival Musica Nigella 

Tignynoyelle